"Mighty Love" is a 1973 song recorded by the American R&B vocal group The Spinners (known as "Detroit Spinners" in the UK). The song was co-written by Joseph B. Jefferson, Bruce Hawes and Charles Simmons and was produced by Thom Bell.

Background
Recorded at Philly's Sigma Sound Studios, the house band MFSB provided the backing.  Bobbie Smith and Philippé Wynne rotate lead vocals during the first half of the song, with Wynne taking over completely for the final two and half minutes. During live performances by the Spinners, the song was often used to showcase Wynne's exceptional ad-lib ability.

Chart performance
When it was released as the lead single from the album of the same name, the song was split into two parts and "Mighty Love – Pt.1" became another hit for the group, holding the number one spot on the US R&B singles chart for two weeks in March 1974 while also reaching number twenty on the pop singles chart.

Personnel
 Lead vocals by Bobbie Smith and Philippé Wynne
 Background vocals by Bobbie Smith, Philippé Wynne, Pervis Jackson, Henry Fambrough and Billy Henderson
 Additional background vocals by Linda Creed and The Sweethearts of Sigma (Barbara Ingram, Carla Benson, and Evette Benton)
 Instrumentation by MFSB

Chart history

Cover versions
Todd Rundgren (A Cappella, 1985) and Phil Perry (A Mighty Love, 2007) are among artists who have covered the song.

References

1973 singles
The Spinners (American group) songs
1973 songs
Atlantic Records singles